Oslo is an unincorporated community in Vernon Township, Dodge County, Minnesota, United States, near Hayfield.  The community is located near the junction of State Highway 30 (MN 30) and Dodge County Road 13.  The South Fork of the Zumbro River flows nearby.

History
A post office was established at Oslo in 1879, and remained in operation until 1902. The community was named after Oslo, in Norway.

References

Unincorporated communities in Dodge County, Minnesota
Unincorporated communities in Minnesota